Thomas Allen "Scotty" McClymont (5 January 1892 – 18 December 1974) was a New Zealand rugby league footballer who played in the 1910s and 1920s, and coached in the 1920s through to the 1950s. He represented New Zealand.

Early years
Thomas McClymont was born in Karangahake. McClymont represented the Goldfields sub-union in rugby union.

Playing career
McClymont played for Ponsonby United in the Auckland Rugby League competition, making his debut in 1913, and represented Auckland. He was to be selected at fullback for New Zealand for the 1914 Test against Great Britain; however an injury delayed his debut until after the War.

McClymont was selected as Ponsonby captain in 1919. In 1919 he was selected for the New Zealand team, and played in four Test matches for them between 1919 and 1924. McClymont captained New Zealand in the first Test match against Great Britain in 1924. Unfortunately a broken arm in this match hastened his retirement.

Coaching career
In 1928 McClymont coached New Zealand for a three-match Test series against Great Britain. New Zealand lost 1–2. During the 1930s, McClymont coached Richmond in the Auckland Rugby League competition while remaining a New Zealand selector.

McClymont again became coach in 1936 for two tests against England and two further tests against Australia in 1937. He was named as one of the three selectors for the New Zealand team to tour England and France in 1939. He retained the role after World War II, coaching the Kiwis between 1947 and 1952. During this time he led a tour of Australia in 1939 and two tours of Great Britain and France, in 1947-48 and 1951–52. In 1958 McClymont coached the Northern Districts side in the ARL Competition. Districts were a combination of the North Shore and Northcote teams.

McClymont died in 1974 and was buried at Purewa Cemetery in Auckland. He was inducted as a New Zealand Rugby League Legend of League in 2007.

References

1892 births
1974 deaths
Auckland rugby league team players
Burials at Purewa Cemetery
New Zealand national rugby league team captains
New Zealand national rugby league team coaches
New Zealand national rugby league team players
New Zealand rugby league coaches
New Zealand rugby league players
Ponsonby Ponies players
Richmond Bulldogs coaches
Rugby league centres
Rugby league five-eighths
Rugby league fullbacks
Rugby league halfbacks